Kenule Beeson "Ken" Saro-Wiwa (10 October 1941 – 10 November 1995) was a Nigerian writer, television producer, and environmental activist. Ken Saro-Wiwa was a member of the Ogoni people, an ethnic minority in Nigeria whose homeland, Ogoniland, in the Niger Delta, has been targeted for crude oil extraction since the 1950s and has suffered extreme environmental damage from decades of indiscriminate petroleum waste dumping.

Initially as a spokesperson, and then as the president, of the Movement for the Survival of the Ogoni People (MOSOP), Saro-Wiwa led a nonviolent campaign against environmental degradation of the land and waters of Ogoniland by the operations of the multinational petroleum industry, especially the Royal Dutch Shell company. He criticised the Nigerian government for its reluctance to enforce environmental regulations on the foreign petroleum companies operating in the area.

At the peak of his non-violent campaign, he was tried by a special military tribunal for allegedly masterminding the murder of Ogoni chiefs at a pro-government meeting, and hanged in 1995 by the military dictatorship of General Sani Abacha. His execution provoked international outrage and resulted in Nigeria's suspension from the Commonwealth of Nations for over three years.

Biography

Early life
Kenule Saro-Wiwa was born in Bori, near Port-Harcourt, Nigeria on 10 October 1941. He was the son of Chief Jim Wiwa, a forest ranger who held a title in the Nigerian chieftaincy system, and his third wife Widu. He officially changed his name to Saro-Wiwa after the Nigerian Civil War. 
He was married to Maria Saro Wiwa.
His father's hometown was the village of Bane, Ogoniland, whose residents speak the Khana dialect of the Ogoni language. He spent his childhood in an Anglican home and eventually proved himself to be an excellent student. He received primary education at a Native Authority school in Bori, then attended secondary school at Government College Umuahia. A distinguished student, he was captain of the table tennis team and amassed school prizes in History and English. On the completion of his secondary education, he obtained a scholarship to study English at the University of Ibadan. At Ibadan, he plunged into academic and cultural interests, he won departmental prizes in 1963 and 1965 and worked for a drama troupe. The travelling drama troupe performed in Kano, Benin, Ilorin and Lagos and collaborated with the Nottingham Playhouse theater group that included a young Judi Dench. He briefly became a teaching assistant at the University of Lagos and later at University of Nigeria, Nsukka. He was an African literature lecturer in Nsukka when the civil war broke out, he supported the Federal Government and had to leave the region for his hometown at Bori. On his journey to Port-Harcourt, he witnessed the multitudes of refugees returning to the East, a scene he described as a "sorry sight to see". Three days after his arrival to Bonny, it fell to federal troops. He and his family then stayed in Bonny, he travelled back to Lagos and took a position at the University of Lagos which did not last long as he was called back to Bonny.

He was called back to become the Civilian Administrator for the port city of Bonny in the Niger Delta. During the Nigerian Civil War he positioned himself as an Ogoni leader dedicated to the Federal cause. He followed his job as an administrator with an appointment as a commissioner in the old Rivers State. His best known novel, Sozaboy: A Novel in Rotten English (1985), tells the story of a naive village boy recruited to the army during the Nigerian Civil War of 1967 to 1970, and intimates the political corruption and patronage in Nigeria's military regime of the time. His war diaries, On a Darkling Plain (1989), document his experience during the war. He was also a successful businessman and television producer. His satirical television series, Basi & Company, was wildly popular, with an estimated audience of 30 million.

In the early 1970s, he served as the Regional Commissioner for Education in the Rivers State Cabinet. But was dismissed in 1973 because of his support for Ogoni autonomy. In the late 1970s, he established a number of successful business ventures in retail and real estate, and during the 1980s concentrated primarily on his writing, journalism and television production. In 1977, he became involved in the political arena running as the candidate to represent Ogoni in the Constituent Assembly. He lost the election in a narrow margin. It was during this time he had a fall out with his friend Edwards Kobani.

His intellectual work was interrupted in 1987 when he re-entered the political scene, having been appointed by the newly installed dictator Ibrahim Babangida to aid the country's transition to democracy. But he resigned because he felt Babangida's supposed plans for a return to democracy were disingenuous. His sentiments were proven correct in the coming years, as Babangida failed to relinquish power. In 1993, Babangida annulled Nigeria's general elections that would have transferred power to a civilian government, sparking mass civil unrest and eventually forcing him to step down, at least officially, that same year.

Works
Saro-Wiwa's works include TV, drama and prose writing. His earlier works from 1970s to 1980s were mostly satirical displays that portray a counter-image of Nigerian society. But his later writings were more inspired by political dimensions such as environmental and social justice than satire.

Transistor Radio, one of his best known plays was written for a revue during his university days at Ibadan but still resonated well with Nigerian society and was adapted into a television series. Some of his works drew inspiration from the play. In 1972, a radio version of the play was produced and in 1985, he produced Basi and Company, a successful screen adaption of the play. He included the play in Four Farcical Plays and Basi and Company: Four Television Plays. Basi and Company, an adaptation of Transistor Radio, ran on television from 1985 to 1990. A farcical comedy, the show chronicles city life and is anchored by the protagonist, Basi, a resourceful and street-wise character looking for ways to achieve his goal of obtaining millions which always ends to become an illusive mission.

In 1985, the Biafran Civil War novel Sozaboy was published. The protagonist's language was written in nonstandard English or what He called "Rotten English", a hybrid language of pidgin English, standard English and broken English.

Activism
In 1990, he began devoting most of his time to human rights and environmental causes, particularly in Ogoni land. He was one of the earliest members of the Movement for the Survival of the Ogoni People (MOSOP), which advocated for the rights of the Ogoni people. The Ogoni Bill of Rights, written by MOSOP, set out the movement's demands, including increased autonomy for the Ogoni people, a fair share of the proceeds of oil extraction, and remediation of environmental damage to Ogoni lands. In particular, MOSOP struggled against the degradation of Ogoni lands by Royal Dutch Shell.

In 1992, He was imprisoned for several months, without trial, by the Nigerian military government.

He was Vice Chairman of the Unrepresented Nations and Peoples Organization (UNPO) General Assembly from 1993 to 1995. UNPO is an international, nonviolent, and democratic organisation (of which MOSOP is a member). Its members are indigenous peoples, minorities, and under-recognised or occupied territories who have joined together to protect and promote their human and cultural rights, to preserve their environments and to find nonviolent solutions to conflicts which affect them.

In January 1993, MOSOP organised peaceful marches of around 300,000 Ogoni people– more than half of the Ogoni population – through four Ogoni urban centres, drawing international attention to their people's plight. The same year the Nigerian government occupied the region militarily.

Arrest and execution
He was arrested again and detained by Nigerian authorities in June 1993 but was released after a month.
On 21 May 1994, four Ogoni chiefs (all on the conservative side of a schism within MOSOP over strategy) were brutally murdered. Saro-Wiwa had been denied entry to Ogoniland on the day of the murders, but he was arrested and accused of inciting them. He denied the charges but was imprisoned for more than a year before being found guilty and sentenced to death by a specially convened tribunal. The same happened to eight other MOSOP leaders who, along with Saro-Wiwa, became known as the Ogoni Nine.

Some of the defendants' lawyers resigned in protest against the alleged rigging of the trial by the Abacha regime. The resignations left the defendants to their own means against the tribunal, which continued to bring witnesses to testify against Saro-Wiwa and his peers. Many of these supposed witnesses later admitted that they had been bribed by the Nigerian government to support the criminal allegations. At least two witnesses who testified that Saro-Wiwa was involved in the murders of the Ogoni elders later recanted, stating that they had been bribed with money and offers of jobs with Shell to give false testimony, in the presence of Shell's lawyer.

The trial was widely criticised by human rights organisations, and six months later, Saro-Wiwa received the Right Livelihood Award for his courage, as well as the Goldman Environmental Prize.

On 8 November 1995, a military ruling council upheld the death sentences. The military government then immediately moved to carry them out. The prison in Port Harcourt was selected as the place of execution. Although the government wanted to carry out the sentences immediately, it had to wait two days for a gallows to be built. Within hours of the sentences being upheld, nine coffins were taken to the prison, and the following day a team of executioners was flown in from Sokoto to Port Harcourt.

On 10 November 1995, Saro-Wiwa and the rest of the Ogoni Nine were taken from the army base where they were being held to Port Harcourt prison. They were told that they were being moved to Port Harcourt because it was feared that the army base they were being held in might be attacked by Ogoni youths. The prison was heavily guarded by riot police and tanks, and hundreds of people lined the streets in anticipation of the executions. After arriving at Port Harcourt prison, Saro-Wiwa and the others were herded into a single room and their wrists and ankles were shackled. They were then led one by one to the gallows and executed by hanging, with Saro-Wiwa being the first. It took five tries to execute him due to faulty equipment. His last words were: "Lord take my soul, but the struggle continues." After the executions, the bodies were taken to the Port Harcourt Cemetery under armed guard and buried. Anticipating disturbances as a result of the executions, the Nigerian government deployed tens of thousands of troops and riot police to two southern provinces and major oil refineries around the country. The Port Harcourt Cemetery was surrounded by soldiers and tanks.

The executions provoked a storm of international outrage. The United Nations General Assembly condemned the executions in a resolution which passed by a vote of 101 in favor to 14 against and 47 abstentions. The European Union condemned the executions, which it called a "cruel and callous act", and imposed an arms embargo on Nigeria. The United States recalled its ambassador from Nigeria, imposed an arms embargo on Nigeria, and imposed travel restrictions on members of the Nigerian military regime and their families. The United Kingdom recalled its high commissioner in Nigeria, and British Prime Minister John Major called the executions "judicial murder." South Africa took a primary role in leading international criticism, with President Nelson Mandela urging Nigeria's suspension from the Commonwealth of Nations. Zimbabwe and Kenya also backed Mandela, with Kenyan President Daniel arap Moi and Zimbabwean President Robert Mugabe backing Mandela's demand to suspend Nigeria's Commonwealth membership, but a number of other African leaders criticized the suggestion. Nigeria's membership in the Commonwealth of Nations was ultimately suspended, and Nigeria was threatened with expulsion if it did not transition to democracy in two years. The US and British governments also discussed the possibility of an oil embargo backed by a naval blockade of Nigeria.

Ken Saro-Wiwa Foundation 
The Ken Saro-Wiwa foundation was established in 2017 to work towards improved access to basic resources such as electricity and Internet for entrepreneurs in Port Harcourt. The association founded the Ken Junior Award, named for Saro-Wiwa's son Ken Wiwa, who died in October 2016. The award is presented to innovative start-up technology companies in Port Harcourt.

Family lawsuits against Royal Dutch Shell

Beginning in 1996, the Center for Constitutional Rights (CCR), Earth Rights International (ERI), Paul Hoffman of Schonbrun, DeSimone, Seplow, Harris & Hoffman and other human rights attorneys have brought a series of cases to hold Shell accountable for alleged human rights violations in Nigeria, including summary execution, crimes against humanity, torture, inhumane treatment and arbitrary arrest and detention. The lawsuits are brought against Royal Dutch Shell and Brian Anderson, the head of its Nigerian operation.

The cases were brought under the Alien Tort Statute, a 1789 statute giving non-US citizens the right to file suits in US courts for international human rights violations, and the Torture Victim Protection Act, which allows individuals to seek damages in the US for torture or extrajudicial killing, regardless of where the violations take place.

The United States District Court for the Southern District of New York set a trial date of June 2009. On 9 June 2009 Shell agreed to an out-of-court settlement of US$15.5 million to victims' families. However, the company denied any liability for the deaths, stating that the payment was part of a reconciliation process. In a statement given after the settlement, Shell suggested that the money was being provided to the relatives of Saro-Wiwa and the eight other victims, to cover the legal costs of the case and also in recognition of the events that took place in the region. Some of the funding is also expected to be used to set up a development trust for the Ogoni people, who inhabit the Niger Delta region of Nigeria. The settlement was made just days before the trial, which had been brought by Saro-Wiwa's son, was due to begin in New York.

Legacy
His death provoked international outrage and the immediate suspension of Nigeria from the Commonwealth of Nations, as well as the calling back of many foreign diplomats for consultation. The United States and other countries considered imposing economic sanctions. Other tributes to him include:

Artwork and memorials
A memorial to Saro-Wiwa was unveiled in London on 10 November 2006 by London organisation Platform. It consists of a sculpture in the form of a bus and was created by Nigerian-born artist Sokari Douglas Camp. It toured the UK the following year.

Awards
The Association of Nigerian Authors is a sponsor of the Ken Saro-Wiwa Prize for Prose.
 He is named a Writer hero by The My Hero Project.

Literature
His execution is quoted and used as an inspiration for Beverley Naidoo's novel The Other Side of Truth (2000).
Richard North Patterson published a novel, Eclipse (2009), based on Saro-Wiwa's life.

Kenule Beeson Saro-Wiwa Polytechnic 
The Governor of Rivers State, Ezenwo Nyesom Wike, renamed the Rivers State Polytechnic after Saro-Wiwa.

Maynooth University 
A collection of handwritten letters by Saro-Wiwa was donated to Maynooth University by Sister Majella McCarron. The collection includes 27 poems, recordings of visits and meetings with family and friends after Saro-Wiwa's death, a collection of photographs and other documents. The letters are now in the Digital Repository of Ireland (DRI).

The Ken Saro-Wiwa Archive is housed in Special Collections at Maynooth University.

Music
 The Italian band Il Teatro degli Orrori dedicated their song "A sangue freddo" ("In cold blood" – also the title track of their second album) to Saro-Wiwa.
 The Finnish band Ultra Bra dedicated their song "Ken Saro-Wiwa on kuollut" ("Ken Saro-Wiwa is dead") to Saro-Wiwa.
 Saro-Wiwa's execution inspired the song "Rational" by Canadian band King Cobb Steelie.
 The Nigerian singer Nneka makes reference to Saro-Wiwa in her song "Soul is Heavy".

Streets
Amsterdam named a street after Saro-Wiwa, the Ken Saro-Wiwastraat.

Documentary
A BBC World Service Radio Documentary, "Silence Would Be Treason", was broadcast in January 2022. It is presented by his daughter Noo Saro-Wiwa and voiced by Ben Arogundade.

Personal life
He and his wife Maria had five children, who grew up with their mother in the United Kingdom while their father remained in Nigeria. They include Ken Wiwa and Noo Saro-Wiwa, both journalists and writers, and Noo's twin Zina Saro-Wiwa, a journalist and filmmaker. In addition, Saro-Wiwa had two daughters (Singto and Adele) with another woman. He also had another son, Kwame Saro-Wiwa, who was only one year old when his father was executed.

Biographies
Canadian author J. Timothy Hunt's The Politics of Bones (September 2005), published shortly before the 10th anniversary of Saro-Wiwa's execution, documented the flight of Saro-Wiwa's brother Owens Wiwa, after his brother's execution and his own imminent arrest, to London and then on to Canada, where he is now a citizen and continues his brother's fight on behalf of the Ogoni people. Moreover, it is also the story of Owens' personal battle against the Nigerian government to locate his brother's remains after they were buried in an unmarked mass-grave.
Ogoni's Agonies: Ken Saro Wiwa and the Crisis in Nigeria (1998), edited by Abdul Rasheed Naʾallah, provides more information on the struggles of the Ogoni people
Onookome Okome's book, Before I Am Hanged: Ken Saro-Wiwa—Literature, Politics, and Dissent (1999) is a collection of essays about Wiwa
In the Shadow of a Saint: A Son's Journey to Understanding His Father's Legacy (2000), was written by his son Ken Wiwa.
Saro-Wiwa's own diary, A Month and a Day: A Detention Diary, was published in January 1995, two months after his execution.
 In Looking for Transwonderland - Travels in Nigeria, his daughter Noo Saro-Wiwa tells the story of her return to Nigeria years after her father's murder.

Bibliography

See also
 History of Nigeria
 Isaac Adaka Boro
 List of people from Rivers State
 Petroleum industry in Nigeria

References

Sources

External links

 "Standing Before History: Remembering Ken Saro-Wiwa" at PEN World Voices, sponsored by Guernica Magazine in New York City on 2 May 2009.
 "The perils of activism: Ken Saro-Wiwa" by Anthony Daniels
 Letter of protest published in the New York Review of Books shortly before Saro-Wiwa's execution.
 Ken Saro-Wiwa's son, Ken Wiwa, writes a letter on openDemocracy.net about the campaign to seek justice for his father in a lawsuit against Shell – "America in Africa: plunderer or part"
 The Ken Saro-Wiwa Foundation
 Remember Saro-Wiwa campaign
 PEN Centres honour Saro-Wiwa's memory – IFEX
 The Unrepresented Nations and Peoples Organisation (UNPO) 1995 Ogoni report
 Right Livelihood Award recipient
 The Politics of Bones, by J. Timothy Hunt
 Wiwa v. Shell trial information
 Ken Saro-Wiwa at Maynooth University
 Ken Saro-Wiwa at the Digital Repository of Ireland

 
1941 births
1995 deaths
20th-century executions by Nigeria
20th-century male writers
20th-century Nigerian writers
Activists from Rivers State
Burials at the Port Harcourt Cemetery
Environmental killings
Executed Nigerian people
Goldman Environmental Prize awardees
Government College Umuahia alumni
Media people from Rivers State
Nigerian activists
Nigerian democracy activists
Nigerian environmentalists
Nigerian pacifists
Nigerian writers
Nonviolence advocates
Ogoni people
People associated with Maynooth University
People executed by Nigeria by hanging
People from Bori
People of Rivers State in the Nigerian Civil War
Petroleum politics
Prisoners and detainees of Nigeria
Rivers State Commissioners of Education
Shell plc
University of Ibadan alumni
Academic staff of the University of Lagos
Victims of human rights abuses
Wiwa family
Writers from Rivers State
Land defender